Patratu is a census town in the Patratu (community development block) in the Ramgarh subdivision of the Ramgarh district in the Indian state of Jharkhand.

Geography

Location
It has an average elevation of 405 metres (1328 feet)
Patratu Dam was constructed under the planning of the greatest Indian engineer and father of Indian engineering, Sir Mokshagundam Visvesvaraya. This dam is only 40 km away from Ranchi, the capital of Jharkhand, from where it can be reached by road in less than an hour. It is directly connected to Ranchi, Patna, Jaipur, Jamshedpur, Varanasi, Jammu, Jabalpur, Allahabad, Delhi and Kolkata by train.

Area overview
Ramgarh has a vibrant coal-mining sector. The map alongside provides links to five operational areas of Central Coalfields spread across South Karanpura Coalfield, Ramgarh Coalfield and West Bokaro Coalfield. Four of the six CD blocks in the district have coal mines – Patratu, Ramgarh, Mandu and Chitarpur. The high concentration of census towns in these blocks are noticeable on the map. Only two blocks, Gola and Dulmi, are totally rural areas. Ramgarh district lies in the central part of the Chota Nagpur Plateau. The Damodar valley covers most of the district. The forested areas in highlands to the north and the south of the valley can be seen in the map (mark the shaded areas). "Chotanagpur has a charm of its own... The entire area forms one of the most charming series of views imaginable. The far-off hills in the background in exquisite tints of blue or purple as the light falls, the nearer hills picturesquely shaped and luxuriant in every shade of green with their bold escarpments in black or grey, and the brown plains below furnishing their quota of colours." 

Note: The map alongside presents some of the notable locations in the district. All places marked in the map are linked in the larger full screen map.

Civic administration

Police station
Patratu police station serves Patratu CD block.

CD block HQ
The headquarters of Patratu CD block is located at Patratu town.

Demographics
According to the 2011 Census of India, Patratu had a total population of 32,899, of which 17,305 (53%) were males and 15,594 (47%) were females. Population in the age range 0-6 years was 3,999. The total number of literate persons in Patratu was 24,382 (84.37% of the population over 6 years).

 India census, Patratu had a population of 32,132. Males constitute 54% of the population and females 46%.Patratu has an average literacy rate of 70%, higher than the national average of 59.5%: male literacy is 79%, and female literacy is 61%. In Patratu, 13% of the population is under 6 years of age.

Infrastructure
According to the District Census Handbook 2011, Ramgarh, Patratu covered an area of 1.392 km2. Among the civic amenities, it had 25 km roads with both open and closed drains, the protected water supply involved tap water from treated sources, uncovered wells, overhead tanks. It had 5,822 domestic electric connections, 120 road lighting points. Among the medical facilities, it had 4 hospitals, 1 dispensary, 1 health centre, 1 family welfare centre, 8 maternity and child welfare centres, 6 maternity homes, 16 nursing homes, 10 medicine shops. Among the educational facilities it had 14 primary schools, 6 middle schools, 5 secondary schools, 2 senior secondary schools, 1 general degree college. It had 1 non-formal educational centre (Sarva Siksha Abhiyan). Among the social, recreational and cultural facilities it had 1 stadium, 1 cinema theatre, 3 auditorium/ community halls, 3 public libraries, 1 reading room. An important commodity It produced was electricity. It had the branch offices of 3 nationalised banks, 1 agricultural credit society.

Education
Schools in Patratu include:
S.S High School was established on 1 January 1963. It is located beside road leading to Patratu dam and subsequently Ranchi. It is a 10+2 school with a large area and a big playground.
Kendriya Vidyalaya Patratu
D.A.V. Public School Patratu
O P Jindal School Patratu
Patratu School of Economics
Saraswati Shishu Vidya Mandir, Patratu
Jawahar Navodaya Vidyalaya, Patratu

Colleges
Patratu Thermal Power Station (PTPS) College, affiliated with Vinoba Bhave University was established at Patratu in 1972.

Transportation

Airways
Birsa Munda Airport is the nearest airport, with direct flights available to Delhi, Kolkata, Mumbai, Hyderabad, Jharsuguda, Indore, Bhubaneswar, Bangalore and Patna.

Railways
Patratu Railway Station is the only railway station. It has three platforms with direct trains available for Kolkata in Up direction, and in the down direction New Delhi, Patna and many states of India like Punjab and Haryana.

Roadways
Patratu is connected by State Highway 2 of Jharkhand, to its district headquarters at Ramgarh and state capital at Ranchi. There is also a bus station where buses are available for many cities of Jharkhand and West Bengal.

Latest happenings
Jharkhand Chief Minister Raghubar Das on 13 July 2015 inaugurated the Patratu unit of Burnpur Cement.

Patratu Dam
The dam was made to store water of the Nalkari River for supply to the Ramgarh cantonment area as well as being the main reservoir for the Patratu Thermal Power Station (PTPS). There have been plans to turn it into a tourist attraction

Patratu valley

During recent changes, the area's coal pulling bicycles have gotten the support of local motor bikers on a profit sharing basis.

Patratu Thermal Power Station

The attraction of this city is its natural habitat and scenic beauty. The city is developed as a residential area for employees of the Patratu Thermal Power Station. This thermal power station was made by Russian collaboration in 1962. It has two chimneys made by a Russian firm, which are called the Russian side. The other two chimneys were made by an Indian firm, so it is called the Indian side. The plant has a power generation capacity of 840MW.

References

Cities and towns in Ramgarh district